The 1928 Rhode Island Rams football team was an American football team that represented Rhode Island State College (later renamed the University of Rhode Island) as a member of the New England Conference during the 1928 college football season. In its ninth season under head coach Frank Keaney, the team compiled a 2–7 record (0–3 against conference opponents) and finished in last place in the conference.

Schedule

References

Rhode Island State
Rhode Island Rams football seasons
Rhode Island State Rams football